The 1989 Wightman Cup was the 61st and final edition of the annual women's international tennis competition between the United States and Great Britain. It was held at The College of William & Mary in Williamsburg, Virginia in the United States and played on indoor hard courts. The Wightman Cup was discontinued on February 20, 1990.

Notable stories

Youngest player ever to play in Wightman Cup
In this edition of the Cup 13-year-old Jennifer Capriati played the second match against Clare Wood, notching a 6–0, 6–0 victory over the Briton. She became the youngest player to play in the Wightman Cup's history, beating the previous record by two years.

References

1989
1989 in English tennis
1989 in women's tennis
1989 in American tennis
1989 in British sport 
1989 in sports in Virginia